Irvine Butterfield (1936–2009) was an environmentalist, hillwalker and author of several books about mountains and the outdoor environment who took a significant role in the running of organisations with such interests in Scotland. He was a good organiser and volunteered large amounts of his time to causes he believed in.

Personal life

Butterfield was born in Farnhill, North Yorkshire on 8 August 1936 and from his youth he was a keen walker. He worked at the local gasworks and then in the Post Office. In 1957 he moved to London to start his lifetime career with HM Customs and Excise, in 1960 transferring to its whisky departments in Perth, Dundee and then Inverness. It was here that he developed his love for the Scottish hills.

Butterfield was a burly man, not built with the physique for climbing, who never claimed to be more than a hillwalker. He admitted that to climb the Inaccessible Pinnacle  "a climbing friend from Manchester hauled me up it".

Butterfield died in Dundee on 12 May 2009, survived by Moira Gillespie, his partner. His ashes were scattered at Loch Clair, just east of Upper Loch Torridon at a place looking towards Liathach, a favourite view for Butterfield; and at Kinloch, near the Dibidil bothy, a simple memorial stone was erected with a quote from William Blake "Great things are done when men and mountains meet; This is not done by jostling in the street."

Scottish hillwalking books and environmentalism

When in Perth he started climbing the Scottish mountains and became particularly attracted to Schiehallion. An interest in improving bothies, remote highland shelters, led to him becoming secretary of the Mountain Bothies Association from 1969 to 1972. In 1972 he published a book about a project for repairing Dibidil bothy on the island of Rùm, and in 1979 he produced a detailed report  A Survey of Shelters in Remote Mountain areas of the Scottish Highlands (1979).

In 1970 Butterfield co-founded the Mountaineering Council of Scotland where he was willing to spend time stuffing magazines into envelopes to post to members and working as a volunteer in the office generally. He gave fund-raising talks and wrote, without payment, articles illustrated with his own photographs to be included in the club magazine. He was in favour of a specifically Scottish organisation, one intended to help individual hill-walkers and not just the established mountaineering clubs.

A substantial book of over 300 pages, this was an early example of the genre of magnificently illustrated hillwalking books with maps and details of routes, transport and accommodation. For many readers it proved to be an encouragement to explore remote areas of Britain, particularly Scotland.

Butterfield was a founder member of the John Muir Trust, set up in 1983, and by the time it purchased the mountain Schiehallion in 1998 he was a trustee and gave the royalties of his 1999 book The Magic of the Munros towards the cost. He followed this in 2000 with The Call of the Corbetts (a Corbett is a mountain over ) and both books became best-sellers. He was a co-founder and first president of the Munro Society and was a part of the successful campaign to extend the Cairngorms National Park further into Perthshire. He became a director of the John Muir Trust and was the fourth person to be given its Lifetime Achievement Award, after Tom Weir, Adam Watson and Doug Scott.

Publications

References

Scottish mountain climbers
British non-fiction writers
British male writers
1936 births
2009 deaths
British environmentalists
Walkers of the United Kingdom
20th-century non-fiction writers
Male non-fiction writers